The First Federal Electoral District of Yucatán (I Distrito Electoral Federal de Yucatán) is one of the 300 Electoral Districts into which Mexico is divided for the purpose of elections to the federal Chamber of Deputies and one of five such districts in the state of Yucatán.

It elects one deputy to the lower house of Congress for each three-year legislative period, by means of the first past the post system.

District territory
Under the 2005 districting scheme, the district covers the eastern portion of the state and is the largest district, in terms of its area, in Yucatán.

The district's head town (cabecera distrital), where results from individual polling stations are gathered together and collated, is the city of Valladolid.

Previous districting schemes

1996–2005 district
Between 1996 and 2005, Yucatán's First District covered an area broadly similar to its current configuration, with the difference that it accounted for a larger portion of the municipalities on the state's northern coast.

Deputies returned to Congress from this district

XLIX Legislature
 1973–1976: Víctor Cervera Pacheco (PRI)
L Legislature
 1976–1979: Mirna Hoyos Schlamme (PRI)
LI Legislature
 1979–1982: Federico Granja Ricalde (PRI)
LII Legislature
 1982–1984: Víctor Cervera Pacheco (PRI)
 1984–1985: Herbé Rodríguez Abraham (PRI)
LIII Legislature
 1985–1988: Rodolfo Antonio Menéndez y Menéndez (PRI)
LIV Legislature
 1988–1991: Ana Rosa Payán (PAN)
LV Legislature
 1991–1994: Luis Correa Mena (PAN)
LVI Legislature
 1994–1997: Manuel Fuentes Alcocer (PAN)
LVII Legislature
 1997–2000: Orlando Paredes Lara (PRI)
LVIII Legislature
 2000–2003: Jorge Carlos Berlín Montero (PRI)
LIX Legislature
 2003–2006: Roger David Alcocer García (PRI)
LX Legislature
 2006–2009: Joaquín Jesús Díaz Mena (PAN)
LXI Legislature
 2009-2012: Liborio Vidal Aguilar (PRI)

References and notes

Federal electoral districts of Mexico
Geography of Yucatán